The ARV Griffin is a Canadian homebuilt aircraft that was designed by Dave Marsden of the University of Alberta and produced by Canada Air RV and later by AC Millennium Corp, both of Edmonton. When it was available the aircraft was supplied as a kit for amateur construction.

Both companies are out of business and production ended.

Design and development
The aircraft features a strut-braced high wing, a two-seats-in-side-by-side configuration enclosed cockpit accessed via doors, fixed tricycle landing gear, or, optionally conventional landing gear with wheel pants and a single engine in tractor configuration.

The aircraft is made from sheet aluminum. Winglets were a factory option to improve low speed handling, lateral control and STOL performance. Mounts were also available for the  Subaru EA81,  Lycoming O-235  and Suzuki engines.

The seats are fully adjustable and removable.

The fitting of floats and skis was listed as being under development in 1998. The Mark III kit included all-aluminum parts cut and bent, with fuselage, wing and tail assemblies pre-jigged. The aircraft could be bought as four separate sub-kits. The manufacturer estimates the construction time from the supplied kit as 800 hours for the Mark III and 600 hours for the Mark IV.

Operational history
By 1998 the company reported that 18 kits had been sold and three aircraft were flying.

In December 2013 four were registered with Transport Canada and one in the United States with the Federal Aviation Administration.

Variants
Griffin
Griffin Mark III
Griffin Mark IV

Specifications (Griffin Mark III)

References

External links
Company website archives on Archive.org
Photo of a Griffin Mark IV

Griffin
Griffin
1990s Canadian sport aircraft
Single-engined tractor aircraft
High-wing aircraft
Homebuilt aircraft